Indal is a locality situated in Sundsvall Municipality, Västernorrland County, Sweden with 949 inhabitants in 2015. It is located close to the river Indalsälven.

References 

Populated places in Sundsvall Municipality
Medelpad